Ferdinand Bohlmann ( 28 August 1921 - 23 September 1991) was a German chemist, known for his studies of plant natural products chemistry, especially terpenoids and polyynes.

Life 

Bohlmann studied chemistry in Göttingen from 1939 to 1944 . His studies were interrupted by military service and injury. In 1946 he received his doctorate under Hans Brockmann (1903–1988) on chromatography of pyridine compounds. He then worked under Hans Herloff Inhoffen at the University of Marburg. Bohlmann followed Inhoffen to the TH Braunschweig and completed his habilitation there. Bohlmann became a lecturer in 1952 and an adjunct professor in 1957. In 1959 he succeeded Friedrich Weygand at the TU Berlin (1911–1969) at the Institute for Organic Chemistry, where he led a rapidly expanding working group. His most famous academic student is Helmut Schwarz.

Bohlmann died on September 23, 1991.

Work 

Bohlmann's main area of work was natural products chemistry, especially terpenes and polyynes. These were mainly isolated from plants of the Asteraceae family, (formerly Compositae), and their structure was elucidated. Bohlmann also worked on the characterization of quinolizidine alkaloids. Bohlmann's list of publications includes around 1300 publications. His collaboration with the biodiversity informatics working group at the Berlin Botanical Garden resulted in a system with which the chemical substances of the Compositae were made accessible in a database, the "Bohlmann Files". The Bohlmann-Rahtz pyridine synthesis is named after Bohlmann and Dieter Rahtz.

Honors 

In 1954, he received the lecturer prize of the Fonds der Chemischen Industrie. In 1958 he was awarded the Göttingen Academy Prize. The Bohlmann Lecture series was established in his honor in 1989 at the Institute for Chemistry at the TU Berlin. From 2004 to 2018 this event was funded by the Schering Foundation. Since 2019 the event has been carried out in cooperation with Bayer AG.

Bibliography 
 Bohlmann, F., Burkhardt, T., & Zdero, C. (1973). Naturally Occurring Acetylenes. Academic Press.
 Seaman, F., Bohlmann, F., Zdero, C., & Mabry, T. J. (2012). Diterpenes of Flowering Plants: Compositae (Asteraceae). Springer Science & Business Media.

References

External links 
 Biografie in der Festschrift 125 Jahre Technische Universität Berlin auf opus.kobv.de
 Auflistung der wissenschaftlichen Veröffentlichungen Ferdinand Bohlmanns auf bohlmann-ban.de (PDF-Datei; 196 kB)

1921 births
1991 deaths
People from Oldenburg (city)
20th-century German chemists
Academic staff of the Technical University of Berlin